Roland William Hislop (20 April 1884 – 30 May 1948) was a member of the Queensland Legislative Assembly.

Biography
Hislop was born in Brisbane, Queensland, the son of William Hislop and his wife Alice (née Toyne) and educated in Brisbane. He was a well-known furniture manufacturer and after he was finished in politics worked as a welfare officer with the Queensland Apprenticeships Committee.

On 21 December 1909, he married Daisy Elizabeth Davidge (died 1953). Hislop died in May 1948 and was cremated at the Mt Thompson Crematorium.

Public career
Hislop won the seat of Sandgate for the Labor Party at the 1935 Queensland state election, defeating James Kenny of the Country and Progressive National Party. He went on to hold the seat for six years before his defeat at the 1941 Queensland state election by Eric Decker of the Country Party.

References

Members of the Queensland Legislative Assembly
1884 births
1948 deaths
Australian Labor Party members of the Parliament of Queensland
20th-century Australian politicians